Ribeirópolis is a municipality located in the Brazilian state of Sergipe. Its population was 18,773 (2020) and its area is 262 km2.

References

Municipalities in Sergipe